Grupo D'Alma is a Brazilian acoustic guitar band that performed in the 1970s and 1980s.

Career
The band started as a trio in the 1970s. The best personnel included, at various times, André Geraissati, Mozart Mello, Ulisses Rocha, Rui Saleme, Candido Penteado Serra.

Discography
 A Quem Interessar Possa (Clam, 1979)
 D'Alma (Som Da Gente, 1981)
 Cartas de Amor (2013)

References

Musical groups established in the 1970s
World music groups